Shane Abbott is an American politician. He serves as a Republican member for the 5th district of the Florida House of Representatives.

Life and career
Abbott was raised in DeFuniak Springs, Florida. He attended Pensacola Junior College and the University of Florida, where he earned a bachelor's degree in pharmacy. He co-owns The Prescription Place, which has two locations, as well as a Firestone Tire Service Center.

In January 2022, Abbott decided to collect signatures to qualify as a candidate for the 5th district of the Florida House of Representatives. On August 23, 2022, Abbott defeated Vance Coley and Clint Pate in the Republican primary election. No Democratic candidate was nominated to challenge him in the general election. He succeeded Brad Drake.

References 

Living people
Year of birth missing (living people)
Place of birth missing (living people)
Republican Party members of the Florida House of Representatives
21st-century American politicians
Pensacola Junior College alumni
University of Florida alumni